Mmm, Mmmh, Mmmm, Mmmmm!, Mmm mmm mmm and variants may refer to:

Books
"Mmmh!!", a collection of speechless B/W short stories by comic book collective Polaqia

Music
Mmmh! (band), a sub group of Japanese psychedelic band Acid Mothers Temple

Albums
 MMMBop (album), 1996 album by Hanson
Mmm, Mmm, Mmm, 1997 album by Home Cookin'
 Mmhmm, 2004 album by Relient K 
Mmmm!, 2008 album by Floor Thirteen
 Mmm... Gumbo?, 2008 album by Dutch band Room Eleven

Songs
 "Mmm Mmm Baby", 1954 song by The Spiders (American band)
 "Mmm...", 1979 single by Se (band), music David Bowie, lyrics :fi:Yari Knuutinen
 "Mmm Mmm Mmm Mmm", 1993 song by the Crash Test Dummies  
 "Mmm Skyscraper... I Love You", 1993 song by Underworld
 "Mmmh", 2006 song by Die Apokalyptischen Reiter from Riders on the Storm "Mmm...", 2007 song by Irish singer Laura Izibor
 "Mmmh Mmmh", 2014 song by Young Fathers from their album Dead "Mmm Yeah", 2014 song by Austin Mahone
 "Mmm, Mmm, Mmm", 2014 single by Dylan Scott
 "Mmmh", a song by Kai from his 2020 EP Kai''

See also
MMM (disambiguation)
MMMM (disambiguation)